Justin Robert Levens (April 18, 1980 – December 17, 2008) was an American mixed martial artist. A professional competitor from 2004 until 2007, he competed for the UFC, the WEC, the Palace Fighting Championship, and for the Southern California Condors of the IFL. 

Levens and his wife died from gunshot wounds in mid-December 2008. The incident is a murder-suicide, according to law enforcement officials.

Background
Levens grew up poor in the Philadelphia housing projects, as a child with ADHD, and was on his own from age 15. After his parents divorced when Levens was four, he eventually moved to Newport Beach, California, where he learned to channel his aggressive energy from into organized fighting. Levens was also a talented baseball player at Capistrano Valley High School, continuing his career briefly in minor league baseball, and also joined the Navy for a few years before returning to train in martial arts and MMA. Levens began training at Marco Ruas' Vale Tudo academy in Orange County.

Mixed martial arts career
Levens fought from 2004 to 2008, taking the nickname "The Executioner". Levens' first fight was a victory against Hector Carrilo in 2004. He had a string of wins after the Carrilo fight for almost two years.

After his seventh win, he lost to Scott Smith in January 2006. After his loss to Smith, Levens was called in by the UFC to fight former UFC Middleweight Champion Evan Tanner, replacing an injured Jeremy Horn on short notice. He lost the fight in the first round by triangle choke submission. Levens next faced prospect Jorge Santiago at UFC Fight Night 6. He lost the fight after getting caught by a knee in the first round. After two straight losses he was cut from the UFC roster. Levens had a declining record for the remainder of his career, interspersed with a pair of back-to-back victories against Justin Hawes and Brian Warren and 5 straight losses, 3 of which were against future UFC fighters.

Levens' last fight was scheduled for July 2008, but did not occur due to time constraints that led to scheduling issues. He tested positive for oxymorphone before the fight and was suspended until January 2009. Friend Tom Atencio said Levens was troubled by his declining career.

Personal life
Kimbo Luzano, another friend, said Levens may have been depressed about not being able to fight and money issues, as well as troubled by the suicide of fellow MMA fighter and friend Jeremy Williams.

In 2003, Levens was involved in a domestic violence case, and was involved in an assault case over a man who allegedly owed Levens' wife, Sara McLean-Levens, 200 dollars in 2005.

On December 17, 2008, Levens and his wife, Sara, 25, were both found dead in their home in Laguna Niguel, California. Both had died of gunshot wounds; in Levens' case, to his head. The police are investigating the deaths as a possible murder-suicide. No suicide note was found, but a handgun was found close to Leven's body. There were no signs of a struggle.

Mixed martial arts record

|-
| Loss
| align=center| 9–8
| Kenny Ento
| Submission (triangle choke)
| Palace Fighting Championship 4: Project Complete
| 
| align=center| 1
| align=center| 2:15
| Lemoore, California, United States
| 
|-
| Loss
| align=center| 9–7
| Nate James
| Decision (unanimous)
| IFO: Wiuff vs. Salmon
| 
| align=center| 3
| align=center| 5:00
| Las Vegas, Nevada, United States
| 
|-
| Loss
| align=center| 9–6
| Brian Foster
| TKO (punches)
| IFL: Chicago
| 
| align=center| 1
| align=center| 1:17
| Chicago, Illinois, United States
|Return to Middleweight.
|-
| Loss
| align=center| 9–5
| Vladimir Matyushenko
| TKO (strikes)
| IFL: Los Angeles
| 
| align=center| 1
| align=center| 3:53
| Los Angeles, California, United States
|Light Heavyweight bout.
|-
| Loss
| align=center| 9–4
| Reese Andy
| Decision (unanimous)
| IFL: Oakland
| 
| align=center| 3
| align=center| 4:00
| Oakland, California, United States
|Light Heavyweight bout.
|-
| Win
| align=center| 9–3
| Brian Warren
| Technical Submission (triangle choke)
| Beatdown in Bakersfield
| 
| align=center| 1
| align=center| 2:53
| Bakersfield, California, United States
| 
|-
| Win
| align=center| 8–3
| Justin Hawes
| TKO (strikes)
| WEC 24: Full Force
| 
| align=center| 1
| align=center| 1:28
| Lemoore, California, United States
|Catchweight (198 lbs) bout.
|-
| Loss
| align=center| 7–3
| Jorge Santiago
| KO (knee)
| UFC Fight Night 5
| 
| align=center| 1
| align=center| 2:13
| Las Vegas, Nevada, United States
| 
|-
| Loss
| align=center| 7–2
| Evan Tanner
| Submission (triangle choke)
| UFC 59: Reality Check
| 
| align=center| 1
| align=center| 3:14
| Anaheim, California, United States
|Middleweight debut.
|-
| Loss
| align=center| 7–1
| Scott Smith
| KO (punches)
| WEC 18: Unfinished Business
| 
| align=center| 1
| align=center| 1:58
| Lemoore, California, United States
| For the WEC Light Heavyweight Championship.
|-
| Win
| align=center| 7–0
| Jorge Oliveira
| KO (slam)
| WEC 17 
| 
| align=center| 1
| 
| Lemoore, California, United States
| 
|-
| Win
| align=center| 6–0
| Tony Lopez
| Submission (rear naked choke)
| WEC 15
| 
| align=center| 1
| align=center| 3:46
| Lemoore, California, United States
| 
|-
| Win
| align=center| 5–0
| Tosh Cook
| Submission (triangle choke)
| Cold Fury 35
| 
| align=center| 1
| align=center| 3:56
| Porterville, California, United States
| 
|-
| Win
| align=center| 4–0
| Eber Saulido
| TKO
| Total Combat 7
| 
| align=center| 1
| 
| Tijuana, Mexico
| 
|-
| Win
| align=center| 3–0
| Mitch Nester
| TKO
| Gladiator Challenge 33
| 
| align=center| 1
| align=center| 1:02
| Porterville, California, United States
| 
|-
| Win
| align=center| 2–0
| Jeff Dowmam
| KO (kick)
| Gladiator Challenge 28
| 
| align=center| 1
| align=center| 0:09
| Porterville, California, United States
| 
|-
| Win
| align=center| 1–0
| Hector Carrilo
| TKO
| Total Combat 3
| 
| align=center| 1
| align=center| 2:00
| Tijuana, Mexico
|

References

Further reading

External links
 Archived Justin Levens Photo Remembrance Album
 
 

American male mixed martial artists
Mixed martial artists from Pennsylvania
Light heavyweight mixed martial artists
Mixed martial artists utilizing Brazilian jiu-jitsu
1980 births
2008 deaths
Deaths by firearm in California
People from Laguna Niguel, California
Ultimate Fighting Championship male fighters
American practitioners of Brazilian jiu-jitsu
People awarded a black belt in Brazilian jiu-jitsu